Afghan Football Club Chaman or simply Afghan F.C. is a Pakistani professional football club based in Chaman, Balochistan, a border city near Afghanistan. The club plays at their home match Jamal Nasir Stadium in Chaman and competes in Pakistan Premier League.

In 2000, Afghan FC Chaman played in an invitation tour at Kandahar Stadium, Afghanistan, against a local team from Kandahar. During the third and final game of the tour, Taliban religious police burst into the ground and stopped the game in the middle. The Taliban arrested twelve of the Afghan Chaman's players and had their heads shaved as punishment for wearing shorts including Muhammad Essa.

Afghan Chaman are one of the founding members of the Pakistan Premier League. Afghan Chaman avoided relegation in the 2006–07 season, finishing in the ninth spot, 5 points above relegation zone.

Afghan Chaman produced many great players for the national team, including former national team captain and current K-Electric's assistant manager Muhammad Essa and Jadeed Khan.

History
Afghan Chaman was founded in 1957 as Afghan Agency Chaman. On 27 June 1965 they won the "All Pakistan Tournament" in Sibi which became their first ever tournament victory in Pakistan. In 1967 they competed in "All Pakistan General Musa tournament" held at Quetta. In 1999 they competed in All-Pakistan Prime Minister's Peace Cup, where they were placed in group F with WAPDA and Khan Research Laboratories, they lost both their matches by the similar 1–0 score line, knocking them out of the tournament.

Their first top-flight national competition came in 2000, when they competed in the National Football Challenge Cup, they were to face Karachi Port Trust but withdrew from the tournament.

In 2002, they changed their name to current name and competed in All-Pakistan Defense of the Pakistan Unity Solidarity Football Tournament, finishing second in the group behind Karachi Port Trust, although they were replaced by Crescent Textiles Mills.

Honours

Domestic

Cups
 Balochistan Cup
Winners : 2019

See also
 Akhtar Mohiuddin
 Pakistan Premier League

References

Football clubs in Pakistan
Football in Chaman
Association football clubs established in 1960
1960 establishments in Pakistan